Edmonton-Glengarry was a provincial electoral district in Alberta, Canada, mandated to return a single member to the Legislative Assembly of Alberta using the first past the post method of voting from 1979 to 2004.

History

Members of the Legislative Assembly (MLAs)

Election results

1979 general election

1982 general election

1986 general election

1989 general election

1993 general election

1997 general election

2001 general election

See also
List of Alberta provincial electoral districts
Glengarry, Edmonton, a community in Edmonton

References

Further reading

External links
Elections Alberta
The Legislative Assembly of Alberta

Former provincial electoral districts of Alberta
Politics of Edmonton